Mukunda Sen (sometimes known as Makanda) was the King of Palpa from 1518 to 1553.

In 1524, he invaded Kathmandu Valley. After his death in 1553, his kingdom was divided into various kingdoms.

References

1553 deaths
Nepalese monarchs
People from Palpa District
16th-century Nepalese people